The 1939 New Year Honours in New Zealand were appointments by King George VI to various orders and honours to reward and highlight good works by New Zealanders. The awards celebrated the passing of 1938 and the beginning of 1939, and were announced on 3 January 1939.

The recipients of honours are displayed here as they were styled before their new honour.

Knight Bachelor
 Charles Manley Luke  – of Wellington. For public services.
 The Honourable Henry Hubert Ostler – senior puisne judge of the Supreme Court of New Zealand.

Order of Saint Michael and Saint George

Companion (CMG)
 Arthur Telford Donnelly  – of Christchurch. For public services.
 Thomas Donald Horn Hall  – of Wellington; clerk of the House of Representatives.

Order of the British Empire

Commander (CBE)
Civil division
 Thomas Reginald Aickin – of Wellington; private secretary to the Minister of Finance.
 Arthur William Mulligan – of Wellington; general secretary, National Centennial Office, Department of Internal Affairs.

Military division
 Group Captain the Honourable Ralph Alexander Cochrane  – Royal Air Force; Air Department, Wellington.

Officer (OBE)
Civil division
 Sidney John Harrison – of Wellington; general secretary of the New Zealand Returned Soldiers' Association.
 Dr Alice Woodward Horsley  – medical practitioner, Auckland. For social welfare services.
 Samuel Saltzman – of Dunedin. For benefactions to humanitarian institutions.

Military division
 Major Stanley Herbert Crump – New Zealand Staff Corps; deputy quartermaster-general and director of supplies and transport, Army Headquarters, Wellington.

Member (MBE)
Civil division
 Beatrice Alice Campbell – matron of the public hospital, New Plymouth
 Isabel Mona Corkill – Nurse Maude District Nursing Association, Christchurch.
 Nora Philomena Fitzgibbon – nursing adviser to the Plunket Society, Dunedin.
 Mary Fanny Gaby – lady corps superintendent of the St John Ambulance Brigade, Wellington.
 Mary Josephine Martin – matron of the Sunnyside Mental Hospital, Christchurch.
 Cecilia McKenny – of Pahiatua; president of the New Zealand Registered Nurses' Association.
 Janet Anne Moore – nurse instructor in the Department of Health, Wellington. 

Military division
 Warrant Officer Class II (Staff Sergeant-Major) George Ferguson MacCulloch – regimental sergeant-major, Army School of Instruction, Trentham.

British Empire Medal (BEM)
Military division
 Chief Petty Officer Writer Archie Victor Styles – New Zealand Naval Forces, Wellington.

References

New Year Honours
1939 awards
1939 in New Zealand
New Zealand awards